Major General Charles-Arthur Gonse (19 September 1838, Paris – 18 December 1917, Cormeilles-en-Parisis), was Deputy Chief of Staff under the authority of General Raoul Le Mouton de Boisdeffre during the Dreyfus affair.

When confronted with overwhelming evidence that Ferdinand Walsin Esterhazy was guilty of the espionage for which Alfred Dreyfus had wrongfully been convicted, Gonse simply overlooked it and refused to recognize Dreyfus' innocence.

1838 births
1917 deaths
Military personnel from Paris
French generals
Commandeurs of the Légion d'honneur
People associated with the Dreyfus affair
Conseil d'État (France)